Cowie is a surname. Notable people with the surname include:

Alex Cowie (born 1947), also known as Alex Soady, British squash and tennis player
Alexander Cowie (1889-1916), English first-class cricketer, soldier, and poet
Catherine Cowie, American epidemiologist
Chris Cowie, Scottish DJ and producer
Colin Cowie, lifestyle guru
Don Cowie (footballer), association football player
Don Cowie (sailor) (born 1962), New Zealand sailor
Doug Cowie (footballer) (1926–2021), Scottish footballer
Doug Cowie (umpire), New Zealand cricket umpire
Edward Cowie, English Composer
George Cowie, Scottish football player
George Cowie (Wisconsin), American politician
Helen Cowie, Professor of Health and Social Care at University of Sussex
Helen Cowie (doctor) (1875-1956), New Zealand doctor
Jack Cowie, New Zealand cricketer
James Cowie (Australian settler), mayor of Geelong, Victoria
James Cowie (artist), Scottish painter
Jimmy Cowie, Scottish footballer
Lennox Cowie, Scottish astronomer
Mervyn Cowie, Pioneer conservationist in Kenya
Nigel Cowie, British banker
Patience Cowie, British geologist
Peter Cowie, English film historian
Richard Kylea Cowie, British musician better known as Wiley (rapper)
Rob Cowie, Canadian ice hockey player
Robert Cowie, British physician and author
Thomas Jefferson Cowie, US Navy rear admiral
Sir Tom Cowie, English businessman

See also 

 Cowie (disambiguation)
 Cowie Castle
 Bowie
 Dowie

Surnames
Scottish surnames
Surnames of Scottish origin
Surnames of British Isles origin
Surnames of English origin
English-language surnames